Duma is a Kenyan-Ugandan industrial grindcore and noise duo composed of vocalist Martin Khanja (also known as Lord Spike Heart) as well as guitarist and producer Sam Karugu.

History

Duma was formed in 2018 by vocalist Martin Khanja and guitarist-producer Sam Karugu. Both of them were playing in various bands in Nairobi, but the duo came together in Kampala, Uganda, after Khanja moved there to work with the label Nyege Nyege Tapes. The duo's musical style was influenced by the electronic music they had been listening to and playing on synthesizers and computers before as well as heavy metal that they had been playing in their former bands Lust of a Dying Breed and Seeds of Datura, as well as their desire to experiment with a more electronic version of the metal music that they had been making up until that point. The band's name, Duma, means darkness in the Kikuyu language.

The duo's self-titled debut album, Duma, was released on 7 August 2020 to positive reviews. The Guardian's Ammar Kalia awarded the album 4 out of 5 stars, stating "What results is an intriguing picture, one that is challenging yet full of a depth that promises an exciting future for this nascent Kenyan scene." Pitchfork's Mehan Jayasuriya gave the album a 7.5 out of 10, stating that "The Kenyan noise band’s debut is inventive and abrasive, a timely distillation of global chaos and techno-dystopian dread".

Discography

 Duma (2020)
 “Canis” b/w “Mbukinya” (2022)

References

Grindcore musical groups
Noise musical groups
Kenyan musical groups
Musical groups established in 2016
Sub Pop artists
2016 establishments in Kenya